Old Man House was the largest "bighouse" (a type of longhouse)  in what is now the U.S. state of Washington, and once stood on the shore of Puget Sound. Lying at the center of the Suquamish winter village on Agate Pass, just south of the present-day town of Suquamish, it was home to Chief Sealth (Chief Seattle) and Chief Kitsap.

History
The name of the site in Lushootseed was D'Suq'Wub (dxʷsuqʼʷabš), meaning "clear salt water," and is the source of the name of the Suquamish people. The name "Old Man House" comes from the Chinook Jargon word "oleman" meaning "old, worn out", but also meaning "from the old times".  "House" in the Chinook Jargon referred to any kind of building, or even to individual rooms within them.

Archeological investigations have revealed that the village site was occupied for at least 2000 years. Accounts vary as to when the longhouse itself was constructed; many sources indicate it was built in the late 18th or early 19th century, but it might have been built earlier. Reports of the longhouse's size also vary, putting its length between 600 and 1000 feet (approximately 200–300 m).

The lands around Old Man House were retained by the Suquamish tribe after the Point Elliott Treaty was signed in 1855, becoming the Port Madison Indian Reservation. However, the longhouse was burned by the U.S. government in 1870, after Seattle's death. The destruction of the longhouse was intended to encourage the Suquamish to spread out across their reservation and take up farming. After it was burned, the Suquamish rebuilt their village at the site and continued to live there. In 1886 the federal government divided the reservation into allotments which were assigned to individual Suquamish families. In 1904 the U.S. War Department acquired land along Agate Pass, including the site of Old Man House, to build fortifications to protect the new naval shipyards at Bremerton. The village site had to be moved, and the tribe lost much of its water access. The fortifications were never built, and the land purchased by the military was eventually sold in 1937 to a private developer and subdivided for vacation homes. In 1950, the Washington Parks and Recreation Department purchased an acre of waterfront where Old Man House had been located and set it aside as a state park. The park was returned to the Suquamish Tribe on August 12, 2004.

See also
Port Madison Indian Reservation
Suquamish Museum and Cultural Center

Notes

References

External links

Archaeological sites on the National Register of Historic Places in Washington (state)
Buildings and structures in Kitsap County, Washington
Coast Salish art and artifacts
Native American history of Washington (state)
National Register of Historic Places in Kitsap County, Washington